Remina Yoshimoto is a Japanese freestyle wrestler. She won the gold medal in the women's 50 kg event at the 2021 World Wrestling Championships held in Oslo, Norway. She also won the gold medal in her event at the 2022 Asian Wrestling Championships held in Ulaanbaatar, Mongolia.

Achievements

References

External links

 

Living people
Place of birth missing (living people)
Japanese female sport wrestlers
World Wrestling Championships medalists
Asian Wrestling Championships medalists
21st-century Japanese women
2000 births